Rodrigo Ruiz Díaz Molinas (born 15 January 1999) is a Paraguayan footballer who plays as a right winger for Bolivian Primera División club Guabirá.

Career

Club career
Díaz is a product of Club Sol de América. He got his officiel debut for the club on 5 February 2017 against Independiente FBC in the Paraguayan Primera División.

In the summer 2021, Ruiz Díaz moved to Resistencia. In July 2022, Ruiz Díaz joined Bolivian Primera División club Guabirá.

References

External links
 

Living people
1999 births
Paraguayan footballers
Paraguayan expatriate footballers
Association football wingers
Paraguay youth international footballers
Paraguayan Primera División players
Bolivian Primera División players
Club Sol de América footballers
Resistencia S.C. footballers
Club Deportivo Guabirá footballers
Paraguayan expatriate sportspeople in Bolivia
Expatriate footballers in Bolivia